Dancee Plus (or colloquially Dancee +) is an Indian Telugu-language dance competition reality television series, which premiered on 27 December 2020 and broadcast on Star Maa. The series is produced by OAK Entertainments house. The auditions for the show were carried throughout in India, between 1 November 2020 and 30 November 2020.

This series is hosted and presented by Ohmkar with Anee,  Baba Bhaskar, Monal Gajjar, Mumaith Khan, Vishwa Raghu and Yashwanth are the mentors of the show. Sanket Sahadev is the winner of the show and was awarded with ₹20 lakh. Grand finale of the first season was aired on 23 May 2021.

Concept 
Dancee Plus Telugu judges selected 12 contestants/groups from the audition rounds. Later this contestants/groups are divided in between all the 6 judges. So each judge has 2 contestants/groups under his/her mentorship. The series features dance performers, including solo acts, Duo and larger groups representing any style of dance, competing for a grand prize. Contestants dance to a different tune, different theme and different styles every week and scores are given by the judges. If for a judge both teams has eliminated then that respective judge also eliminates.A wildcard as 13th contestant entered.

Series overview

Season 1

Score Chart 
Each judge would give either green or red plus to contestant based on their performance but judges should not give pluses to their respective teams.
Scores are out of 5+ in episode 1–25 and 30–41
Scores are out of 4+ in episode 26–29
Contestants who have received 5+, they will get a chance to win God of Dance Trophy and it indicates that the contestant will be saved in elimination round.

 Team Anee Team Baba Bhaskar Team Mumaith Team Raghu Team Monal Team Yashwanth indicates the contestant won God of Dance Trophy indicates the contestant Eliminated

Eliminations 
1st Elimination : Lungi Mamas
2nd Elimination : 8 Countz
3rd Elimination : Anchy Mumbai
4th Elimination: Ram Lakshman (after the elimination of Ram Lakshman. Judge Mumaith Khan has also been eliminated because both teams of her have eliminated). (Again on the entrance of Priya Burman as a wild card, Judge Mumaith Khan re-entered Dancee+ show on 10-04-2021).
5th Elimination: Team velocity(Again as Wild card team Velocity returned and Monal Gajjar adopted them)
6th Elimination : MMK
7th Elimination: Tejaswini and Maheswari(Reenters again with a wild card in Pre Finale)
8th Elimination: Priya Burman (after the elimination of Priya Burman, Judge Mumaith Khan has also been eliminated because both of her teams and the wild card entrant has been eliminated)
 9th Elimination : Niveditha (Hand Fracture) and she replaced by Maheshwari and Tejeshwini in the pre-finale and were sorted into Baba Bhaskar's team
10th Elimination:Team Velocity(Couldn't practice due to Covid Precaution Norms)
4th Runner up: Darjeeling Devils (Raghu Master team )
3rd Runner Up: Jiya Thakur (Anee master member)
 2nd Runner Up: Vasitony crew (Yashwanth Master team)
Runner Up : Tejaswini and Maheswari(as they are in second position, the judge Baba Bhaskar is runner up judge)
Winner : Sanket sahadev  (as they is in first place, the judge Yashwanth master is winner Judge)

Reception 
The grand premiere has gained 9.0 TRP.

References

External links 

 Dancee Plus on Hotstar

Star Maa original programming
Indian reality television series
Telugu-language television shows
2020 Indian television series debuts
2021 Indian television series endings
Indian dance television shows
Dance competition television shows